The first De Jongh-Elhage cabinet was the 26th cabinet of the Netherlands Antilles.

Composition
The cabinet was composed as follows:

|Minister of General Affairs and Foreign Affairs
|Emily de Jongh-Elhage
|PAR
|26 March 2006
|-
|Minister of the Interior and Constitutional Affairs
|Roland Duncan
|NA
|26 March 2006
|-
|Minister of Education, Youth, Culture, and Sports
|Omayra Leeflang
|PAR
|26 March 2006
|-
|Minister of Finance
|Ersilia de Lannooy
|PNP
|26 March 2006
|-
|rowspan="2"|Minister of Justice
|David Dick
|PAR
|26 March 2006
|-
|Magali Jacoba
|PAR
|14 August 2009
|-
|rowspan="3"|Minister of Public Health and Social Development
|Sandra E. Smith 
||MAN
|26 March 2006
|-
|Ersilia de Lannooy
|PNP
|6 December 2006
|-
|Omayra Leeflang
|PAR
|4 June 2007
|-
|rowspan="3"|Minister of Traffic and Communications
|Kenneth A. Gijsbertha
|MAN
|26 March 2006
|-
|Omayra Leeflang
|PAR
|6 December 2006
|-
|Maurice Adriaens
|FOL
|2007
|-
|rowspan="3"|Minister of Labor and Economic Affairs
|Burney Elhage
||UPB
|26 March 2006
|-
|Elvis Tjin Asjoe
||UPB
|13 July 2007
|-
|Hubert Martis
||UPB
|19 March 2009
|-
|State Secretary of Justice
|Ernie Simmons
|DP
|26 March 2006
|-
|State Secretary of Finance
|Alex Rosaria
|PNP
|26 March 2006
|-
|State Secretary of the Solidarity Fund 
|Shamara Nicholson-Linzey
|WIPM
||26 March 2006
|-
|State Secretary of Traffic and Communications
 Meteorological Service and Aviation
|Julio G. Constancia
|FOL
|10 July 2009
|-
|rowspan="2"|State Secretary of the Interior and Constitutional Affairs
|Hubert Martis
||UPB
|26 March 2006
|-
|Noris Gomes
||UPB
|19 March 2009
|-
|rowspan="4"|State Secretary of Public Health
|Rodolphe Samuel
|NA
|26 March 2006
|-
|Joan Smart-Berkle
|NA
|2007
|-
|George Pantophlet
|NA
|7 January 2009
|-
|Patrick Illidge
|NA
|10 July 2009
|}

References

Cabinets of the Netherlands Antilles
2006 establishments in the Netherlands Antilles
Cabinets established in 2006
Cabinets disestablished in 2010
2010 disestablishments in the Netherlands Antilles